Escape to Victory (stylized as Victory) is a 1981 American-British-Italian sports war film directed by John Huston and starring Sylvester Stallone, Michael Caine, Max von Sydow and Pelé. The film is about Allied prisoners of war who are interned in a German prison camp during the Second World War who play an exhibition match of football against a German team.

The film received great attention upon its theatrical release, as it also starred professional footballers Bobby Moore, Osvaldo Ardiles, Kazimierz Deyna, Paul Van Himst, Mike Summerbee, Hallvar Thoresen, Werner Roth and Pelé. Numerous Ipswich Town players were also in the film, including John Wark, Russell Osman, Laurie Sivell, Robin Turner and Kevin O'Callaghan. Other Ipswich Town players stood in for actors in the football scenes – Kevin Beattie for Michael Caine, and Paul Cooper for Sylvester Stallone. Yabo Yablonsky wrote the script and the film was entered into the 12th Moscow International Film Festival.

Plot
A team of Allied prisoners of war (POWs), coached and led by English Captain John Colby, a professional footballer for West Ham United before the war, agree to play an exhibition match against a German team, only to find themselves involved in a German propaganda stunt.

Colby is the captain and essentially the manager of the team and thus chooses his squad of players. Another POW, Robert Hatch, an American who is serving with the Canadian Army, is not initially chosen, but eventually nags the reluctant Colby into letting him on the team as the team's trainer, as Hatch needs to be with the team to facilitate his upcoming escape attempt.

Colby's superior officers repeatedly try to convince him to use the match as an opportunity for an escape attempt, but Colby consistently refuses, fearing that such an attempt will only result in getting his players killed. Meanwhile, Hatch has been planning his unrelated escape attempt, and Colby's superiors agree to help him if he in return agrees to journey to Paris, contact the French Resistance and try to convince them to help the football team escape.

Hatch succeeds in escaping the prison camp and finding the Resistance in Paris. The Resistance initially believes it will be too risky to aid the team's escape, but once they realise the game will be at the Colombes Stadium, they plan the escape using a tunnel from the Parisian sewer system to the showers in the players' changing room. They convince Hatch to let himself be recaptured so that he can pass this information back to the leading British officers at the prison camp.

Hatch is indeed recaptured. However, he is placed in solitary confinement, and thus the prisoners do not know if the French underground will help them. Colby tells the Germans that he needs Hatch on the team because Hatch is the backup goalkeeper and the starting goalkeeper has broken his arm. Colby himself actually has to break the starting goalkeeper's arm because the Germans want proof of the injury before they will allow Hatch to join the Allied lineup.

In the end, the POWs can leave the German camp only to play the match; they are to be imprisoned again afterward. The resistance's tunnelers break through to the Allied dressing room at halftime with the POWs trailing, 4–1. However, the team  persuades Hatch to return to the pitch for the second half rather than lead the escape as planned.

Despite the match officials being heavily biased towards the Germans, and the German team causing several deliberate injuries to the Allied players, a 4–4 draw is achieved after great performances from Luis Fernandez, Carlos Rey  and Terry Brady. Hatch plays goalkeeper and makes excellent saves, including a save of a penalty kick as time expires to deny the Germans the win. An Allied goal had been blatantly disallowed earlier in the match, so the POWs should have won, 5–4.

After Hatch preserves the draw, the crowd storms the field and swarms the players. Some of the spectators help the Allied players disguise themselves in the chaos so that they can escape, and they all burst through the gates to freedom.

Cast

Production

Development and writing
Filmed in Hungary, the film is based on the 1962 Hungarian film drama Két félidő a pokolban ("Two half-times in Hell"), which was directed by Zoltán Fábri and won the critics' award at the 1962 Boston Cinema Festival.

The film was inspired by the now discredited story of the so-called Death Match in which FC Dynamo Kyiv defeated German soldiers while Ukraine was occupied by German troops in World War II. According to myth, as a result of their victory, the Ukrainians were all shot. The true story is considerably more complex, as the team played a series of matches against German teams, emerging victorious in all of them, before any of them were sent to prison camps by the Gestapo. Four players were documented as being killed by the Germans but long after the dates of the matches they had won.

Football scenes
Escape to Victory featured a great many professional footballers as both the POW team and the German team. Many of the footballers came from the Ipswich Town squad, who were at the time one of the most successful teams in Europe. Despite not appearing on screen, English World Cup-winning goalkeeper Gordon Banks and Alan Thatcher were closely involved in the film, working with Sylvester Stallone on his goalkeeping scenes. Sports Illustrated magazine said "the game is marvelously photographed by Gerry Fisher, under second unit director Robert Riger."

Pelé received a credit for designing the "soccer plays".

Since the movie is set in the early years of the German occupation of France (probably 1941 or 1942), Pelé's character, Corporal Luis Fernandez, is identified as being from Trinidad, not Brazil. Since the Brazilians did not officially join the war against the Axis powers until late August 1942, with the first contingents of Brazilian Expeditionary Force arriving in Italy in July, 1944. Similarly, Argentinian star Osvaldo Ardiles' character, Carlos Rey, is not identified as being from any particular country.

Music
Nearly all of the film's music score borrows heavily from the first and last movements of Dmitri Shostakovich's Symphony No. 7, the Leningrad Symphony, particularly the march theme of the first movement, which is quoted almost verbatim, a practice which the composer Bill Conti would later employ in The Right Stuff with Tchaikovsky's Violin Concerto. Shostakovich's Symphony No. 7 has long been associated with secondary meanings within the music aimed at the Stalinist regime's overwhelming repression of individualism and freedom of expression, but at the time of its composition during the war was said to represent the oppression of Nazism. At the end of the film, the last part of Shostakovich's Symphony No. 5 is also used to signify the triumphant conclusion of the story. However, while the music may fulfil the final moments of Escape to Victory's exultant ending explicitly, it is believed Shostakovich wrote the ending to his symphony to imply forced rejoicing under an authoritarian force. More prosaically, the music also pays tribute to Elmer Bernstein’s score for The Great Escape.

In 2005, the Prometheus Records label issued a limited edition soundtrack album of Conti's score.

Reception

Critical response
On Rotten Tomatoes the film has a 67% rating based on reviews from 9. On Metacritic, the film is rated 57 out of 100 based on 10 critic reviews.

Remake
In March 2019, it was announced that Jaume Collet-Serra will direct a remake also titled Victory. A draft was written by Gavin O'Connor and Anthony Tambakis in 2017, with Tambakis doing a rewrite. Gianni Nunnari and Bernie Goldman will produce.

In Art
The whole audio recording of the second half of the match played in the film has been broadcast from a radio inside the Italian Pavilion of the 59° Esposizione Internazionale d'Arte La Biennale di Venezia, made by Gian Maria Tosatti and curated by Eugenio Viola.

References

External links
 
 
 
 

1981 films
1981 drama films
American drama films
American association football films
1980s English-language films
Films scored by Bill Conti
Films about the French Resistance
Films directed by John Huston
Films set in Germany
Films set in Paris
Films shot in Budapest
Paramount Pictures films
World War II films based on actual events
World War II prisoner of war films
Pelé
1980s American films